Kyle Briggs (born 7 December 1987) is an English professional rugby league footballer who has played in the 2000s and 2010s.

Bradford Bulls

2011 - 2011 Season

Kyle featured in two of the four pre-season games, he played against the Dewsbury Rams and he kicked a goal against the Wakefield Trinity Wildcats.

He featured in 7 games this season. His first was Round 1 (Leeds Rhinos). He picked up an injury and missed the next four. He was not selected again until Round 10 (Salford City Reds), he was dropped again but selected to play against the Hull Kingston Rovers (Rnd 14) and the Salford City Reds (Rnd 15). He was then sent out on loan to Harlequins RL but after he broke his wrist he returned to the Bradford Bulls, after recovering from the broken wrist he appeared against the Crusaders (Rnd 26) and Wakefield Trinity Wildcats (Rnd 27). Kyle scored tries against the Hull Kingston Rovers (1 try), the Salford City Reds (2 tries) and the Wakefield Trinity Wildcats (1 try).

2012 - 2012 Season

Briggs featured in three of the four pre-season friendlies. He played against the Castleford Tigers, the Dewsbury Rams and the Keighley Cougars. Kyle kicked a goal against the Castleford Tigers, scored a try and kicked 2 goals against the Keighley Cougars.

Kyle was loaned back to the Featherstone Rovers for the season.

Sheffield Eagles

Midway through the 2014 Season, Briggs signed for Sheffield Eagles.

References

External links
(archived by web.archive.org) Sheffield Eagles profile
 Profile at featherstonerovers.net

1987 births
Living people
Bradford Bulls players
Dewsbury Rams players
Doncaster R.L.F.C. players
English rugby league players
Featherstone Rovers players
London Broncos players
Rugby league five-eighths
Rugby league halfbacks
Rugby league players from Leeds
Sheffield Eagles players